Khomeyniabad-e Darshahi (also Romanized as Khomeynīābād-e Dārshāhī; also known as Khomeynīābād) is a village in Dana Rural District, in the Central District of Dana County, Kohgiluyeh and Boyer-Ahmad Province, Iran. At the 2006 census, its population was 79, in 13 families.

References 

Populated places in Dana County